The 2001 3 Nations Cup was the sixth playing of the annual women's ice hockey tournament. It was held in Finland, from November 2–7, 2001. The United States withdrew from the tournament due to the September 11 attacks.

Results

Final Table

External links
Tournament on hockeyarchives.info

2001
2001–02 in Finnish ice hockey
2001–02 in Swedish ice hockey
2001–02 in Canadian women's ice hockey
2001–02
2001–02 in women's ice hockey
November 2004 sports events in Europe